Inner Crater is the topographic feature that embraces the crater within the floor of Main Crater, at the summit of Mount Erebus, Ross Island, Antarctica. Inner Crater contains an active anorthoclase–phonolite lava lake. The name is derived from the fact that the crater is within the Main Crater of Mount Erebus.

References

Volcanoes of Ross Island